Ebreichsdorf (Central Bavarian: Ebreichsduaf) is a town in the district of Baden in Lower Austria in Austria.

Population

Mayors
The mayor is since 2010 Wolfgang Kocevar (SPÖ), the predecessor was Josef Pilz (Bürgerliste (Citizens list)).

Personalities 

 Andreas Graf (born 1985), track and road cyclist
 Ida Krottendorf (1927-1998), actress
 Ulla Weigerstorfer (born 1967), Miss World and deputy to the National Council

References

Cities and towns in Baden District, Austria